Sir Ronald Macmillan Algie (22 October 1888 – 23 July 1978) was a New Zealand politician who served as Speaker of the House of Representatives for six years in the 1960s. He described himself as "a Tory in the old tradition".

Early life
Algie was born on 22 October 1888, in Wyndham, a small town in New Zealand's Southland Region. He was educated at Arrowtown, Thames High School and Balclutha District High School. He became a teacher at Paeroa District High School before transferring to a school in Ponsonby and later was the junior English master at Seddon Memorial Technical College. He attended Auckland University College to study law and gained an LLB in 1913 and an LLM in 1915. In 1920, aged 31, he became the first professor of law at Auckland University College. He was noted for his strong intellectual performance, and also for his conservative views.

On 4 December 1917 at St Mary's pro-Cathedral, Parnell, Algie married Helen Adair McMaster, a prominent alpinist whose climbs included an ascent of Aoraki / Mount Cook.

Member of Parliament

In 1937, Algie became the director of the Freedom Association, an organisation which strongly opposed the left-wing Labour Party government of the time. The Freedom Association quickly became linked to the new National Party, and Algie became one of the party's more prominent supporters and was involved in the  electorate. The incumbent MP for Remuera was National's Bill Endean who was unpopular among supporters, so much so that he was nearly deselected for the planned 1941 general election. Endean was overseas at the time of the selection, but even if he had been present, Gustafson believes that the "elderly, dull Endean would have been no match for the clever and witty Algie". Endean was the first sitting National MP who failed to get re-selected. Algie won the seat and entered Parliament.

Algie proved to be a skilled Parliamentary debater, and has been described by Hugh Templeton as the best debater of his time. Even opponents such as Bob Semple respected Algie's rhetorical abilities. He was also noted for remaining polite throughout debates, and for his willingness to apologise for any offence he accidentally gave.

Cabinet minister
After the 1949 election, when Sidney Holland formed the first National government, Algie was immediately elevated to Cabinet. He was initially appointed Minister of Education, and later became Minister of Broadcasting and Minister for Science and Industrial Research. He also co-led the committee that looked into the future of the Legislative Council, the upper house of the New Zealand Parliament, which was abolished from 1951. In the end, however, Algie's proposals for a Senate were not pursued, and New Zealand's parliament has not had an upper house since that time.

In 1953, Algie was awarded the Queen Elizabeth II Coronation Medal. Algie briefly returned to Opposition after the 1957 election, which National lost. In opposition he was appointed Shadow Minister of Foreign Affairs.

Speaker of the House
When National regained power after the 1960 election, Algie is believed to have wanted the post of Minister of External Affairs, but was not given it (possibly because of his age; he was seventy-two). Instead, he was convinced to take up the Speakership. He officially assumed office at the beginning of the 1961 parliamentary term.

As Speaker, Algie was known for his strong insistence on politeness in debates. He also undertook a number of reforms of Parliamentary procedure to accommodate the changing nature of politics. He served six years as Speaker, retiring at the 1966 election. He was generally praised for his performance in the role and in the 1964 Queen's Birthday Honours Algie was appointed a Knight Bachelor. Algie was succeeded in the Remuera seat by Allan Highet.

Algie died in Auckland on 23 July 1978.

Further reading

This tract lists the views of several prominent politicians and educators, including Algie.

Notes

References

External links

 

1888 births
1978 deaths
Members of the Cabinet of New Zealand
New Zealand educators
New Zealand National Party MPs
Speakers of the New Zealand House of Representatives
University of Auckland alumni
Academic staff of the University of Auckland
New Zealand education ministers
New Zealand MPs for Auckland electorates
Members of the New Zealand House of Representatives
New Zealand Knights Bachelor
People educated at South Otago High School
People educated at Thames High School
People from Wyndham, New Zealand
New Zealand politicians awarded knighthoods
20th-century  New Zealand  lawyers